Following is a list of persons who have served in all three branches of the United States federal government. Membership in this list is limited to persons who have:

 served in the executive branch, as President of the United States, Vice President, a Cabinet officer, or another executive branch office requiring confirmation by the United States Senate; and
 served as a member of either the United States Senate or of the House of Representatives; and
 served as a United States federal judge on a court established under Article Three of the United States Constitution.

Summary
Forty-five men can claim to have served in all three federal government branches. The first person to achieve this distinction was John Marshall, when he was confirmed to the Supreme Court in 1801, having briefly served in Congress and as Secretary of State. The most recent person to join the list was James L. Buckley, who had already been President of Radio Free Europe/Radio Liberty and a U.S. Senator when he was appointed to the District of Columbia Circuit Court of Appeals in 1985.

Of those who have served in all three branches, fifteen served as United States Attorneys; five served as Attorney General; five served as Secretary of the Navy; three served as Secretary of the Treasury; three served as Postmaster General, two while this office was still a cabinet post; two served as Secretary of State; two served as Secretary of War; two served as Secretary of the Interior; two served as Commissioner of Internal Revenue; two served as Director of the Office of Economic Stabilization; and one served as Secretary of Labor. Three held multiple Cabinet posts. Although many Presidents and Vice Presidents have also served in Congress, and one later served on the Supreme Court, none has ever served in all three branches. One President, William Howard Taft did head both the Executive and Judicial Branches, having later served as Chief Justice.

With respect to legislative service, sixteen of these men were senators and thirty-four were representatives, of which, five served in both houses of Congress. The states from which they were elected are largely diverse, though thirteen states have multiple members on the list; New York and Virginia tie for the most with four, followed by Ohio with three.

With respect to Judicial service, the tendency is toward higher office. Twelve members of the list served on the Supreme Court of the United States — three as chief justice. Of the other thirty, eight served on one of the federal courts of appeals (called federal circuit courts pre-1912), three went from a district court to a circuit court, and twenty-four garnered their judicial branch service in district court judgeships alone. Two of the Supreme Court Justices on the list had previously served on federal circuit courts. For thirty-three of the members of the list, their judicial appointment was also their final point of service. One Supreme Court justice, two Circuit Court judges and seven District Court judges resigned from the bench to take posts in the executive branch and one Circuit Court judge and four District Court judges resigned from the bench to join the United States Senate.

Seven people on the list—James F. Byrnes, Salmon P. Chase, Mahlon Dickerson, John J. Hickey, Thomas B. Robertson, Donald S. Russell, and Levi Woodbury—have, in addition to their varied federal government service, also served as governor of a U.S. state.

List

Near misses
A number of people have come close to achieving this distinction, having held offices in two branches but having failed in an attempt to hold office in a third branch, or having held offices in two branches and worked for a third branch without holding a constitutional office in that branch:

Executive and legislative
George W. Atkinson served as a U.S. Representative and was both a U.S. Marshal and U.S. Attorney for West Virginia before he was appointed to the U.S. Court of Claims, an Article I court falling under the Executive Branch, not the Judicial Branch.
George Edmund Badger was a U.S. Senator from North Carolina and Secretary of the Navy. He was unsuccessfully nominated to the Supreme Court by President Millard Fillmore in 1853.
Ed Bryant served as a U.S. Representative and as a U.S. Attorney for Tennessee and was later appointed a United States magistrate judge for the United States District Court for the Western District of Tennessee.
John J. Crittenden was a U.S. Representative and Senator from Kentucky, and was twice U.S. Attorney General. He was unsuccessfully nominated to the Supreme Court by President John Quincy Adams in 1828.
Caleb Cushing was a U.S. Representative from Massachusetts and U.S. Attorney General. While he did serve as justice on the Massachusetts Supreme Judicial Court, his nomination for Chief Justice of the United States by President Ulysses S. Grant in 1873 was withdrawn due to lack of support in Congress.
Walter F. George served as a U.S. Senator from Georgia and later as a special ambassador to NATO. He was a judge of the Georgia Court of Appeals and the Supreme Court of Georgia, state positions rather than a federal judgeship.
Ebenezer R. Hoar served as a U.S. Representative from Massachusetts and U.S. Attorney General. He was unsuccessfully nominated to the Supreme Court by President Grant in 1869.
John J. Jenkins was a territorial U.S. Attorney in Wyoming Territory and a U.S. Representative from Wisconsin. He served as a judge of the U.S. District Court for the District of Puerto Rico, but the court had not yet become an Article III court in that period.
John Marvin Jones served as a U.S. Representative from Texas and held various executive branch positions, ultimately being appointed to the U.S. Court of Claims, an Article I court falling under the Executive Branch, not the Judicial Branch.
Levi Lincoln Sr. served as a U.S. Representative from Massachusetts and as both U.S. Attorney General and acting Secretary of State. He was nominated to the Supreme Court by President James Madison in 1811, but declined.
John Pettit was a U.S. Attorney and was both a U.S. Representative and Senator from Indiana. He served as a territorial judge in Kansas Territory, but never as an Article III judge.
James E. Rogan was a U.S. Representative from California and Under Secretary of Commerce for Intellectual Property, a position in which he also held the title of Director of the United States Patent and Trademark Office. He was nominated to the U.S. District Court for the Central District of California by President George W. Bush in 2007, but was blocked by the Democratic-controlled Senate. He later served as Judge of the Superior Court of California, a state position rather than a federal judgeship.
Jeff Sessions served as U.S. Attorney General, U.S. Senator from Alabama, an Assistant U.S. Attorney and as U.S. Attorney for the Southern District of Alabama. He was nominated to the U.S. District Court for the Southern District of Alabama by President Ronald Reagan in 1986, but his nomination was rejected by the Senate Judiciary Committee.
John Canfield Spencer served as a U.S. Representative from New York and as both Secretary of War and Secretary of the Treasury. He was twice unsuccessfully nominated to the Supreme Court by President John Tyler in 1844.
Horace Worth Vaughan was United States Attorney for the District of Hawaii and U.S. Representative from Texas. He was also a judge for the U.S. District Court for the District of Hawaii, which at the time was an Article IV court.
George Henry Williams was a U.S. Senator from Oregon and U.S. Attorney General. While he did serve as justice on the Oregon Territorial Supreme Court, his nomination for Chief Justice of the United States by President Ulysses S. Grant in 1873 was withdrawn due to lack of support in Congress.

Executive and judicial
Guy K. Bard was briefly a U.S. Attorney and later judge of the U.S. District Court for the Eastern District of Pennsylvania. In 1952, he resigned from the bench to run for the U.S. Senate and won the nomination of his party, but lost the election.
Walter Q. Gresham served as a judge on the U.S. District Court for the District of Indiana and the U.S. Court of Appeals for the Seventh Circuit and also as Postmaster General, Secretary of the Treasury, and Secretary of State, but his only legislative service was in the Indiana House of Representatives.
William Lewis served as a U.S. Attorney for Pennsylvania and as judge on the U.S. District Court for the District of Pennsylvania, but he was only elected to the Pennsylvania State Legislature.
Nathaniel Pope was a Secretary of the Illinois Territory and a judge of the U.S. District Court for the District of Illinois. In between, he was a non-voting Delegate to the U.S. House of Representatives from Illinois Territory, not a constitutionally recognized member of the federal legislature.

Legislative and judicial
Frank M. Coffin served as a U.S. Representative from Maine, and as a U.S. Circuit Judge of the U.S. Court of Appeals for the First Circuit. He held three executive branch positions—Managing Director of the Development Loan Fund, Deputy Administrator of the U.S. Agency for International Development, and U.S. Representative to the OECD development assistance committee—but none of these were cabinet-level offices or required Senate confirmation.
David Davis served as an Associate Justice of the Supreme Court and as a U.S. Senator from Illinois, but he was never appointed to the executive branch although he served as Abraham Lincoln's 1860 campaign manager and later as an administrator of Lincoln's estate after the assassination.
Edward C. Eicher served as a U.S. Representative from Iowa and Chief Justice of the U.S. District Court for the District of Columbia. Between holding these two positions, he was a member and chairman of the U.S. Securities and Exchange Commission, an independent agencies of the U.S. government not under direct control of the President.
Oliver Ellsworth served as one of Connecticut's first two U.S. senators and as Chief Justice of the United States. He was an unsuccessful candidate for President of the United States, receiving eleven votes in the electoral college in the U.S. presidential election of 1796. He also served as an Envoy Extraordinary to the Court of France, an unofficial position under the auspices of the executive branch.
John Jay was the first Chief Justice of the United States, and he was also elected to serve as a delegate to the First and Second Continental Congresses and served as U.S. Secretary of Foreign Affairs and as U.S. Minister to Spain before the Constitution was adopted.
Abner Mikva served as a U.S. Representative from Illinois and was a U.S. Circuit Judge on the U.S. Court of Appeals for the D.C. Circuit. He served in the executive branch as White House Counsel, but this position does not require Senate confirmation.
Sherman Minton served as a U.S. Senator from Indiana, a judge on the U.S. Court of Appeals for the Seventh Circuit, and as an Associate Justice of the Supreme Court. In between these offices, he was an advisor to President Franklin D. Roosevelt, but held no official office in the Executive Branch.

See also
List of people who have served in all three branches of a U.S. state government
List of people who have held multiple United States Cabinet-level positions
List of U.S. Supreme Court justices who also served in the U.S. Congress

Congress
Supreme Court
Three Branches Federal